Plymouth is a ghost town and the de jure capital of the island of Montserrat, an overseas territory of the United Kingdom located in the Leeward Island chain of the Lesser Antilles, West Indies.

Constructed on historical lava deposits near the then long-inactive Soufrière Hills volcano, the town was evacuated in 1995 when the volcano resumed erupting. Plymouth was eventually abandoned permanently in 1997 after it was substantially buried by a series of pyroclastic flows and lahars. For centuries, it had been the only port of entry to the island. Plymouth is still the de jure capital of Montserrat, making it the only ghost town that is the capital of a political territory.  A new capital is under construction at Little Bay, with nearby Brades serving as the de facto capital for the time being.

History

St. Anthony's Church
After the establishment of the first European colony on the island of Montserrat in 1632, St. Anthony's Church was established in Plymouth in 1636. Although there is a St. Anthony in Catholicism, it is believed that Governor Anthony Brisket, who went to England to secure funds to build the church, had the church named after himself. The church had to be rebuilt several times throughout its history due to damage from earthquakes and hurricanes. As of September 2021, the church is buried deep in the ash.

Hurricane Hugo
Montserrat was struck by Hurricane Hugo on September 17, 1989. The hurricane destroyed a 180-foot stone jetty in Plymouth's harbour. Many other buildings, including schools, health centres, and the recently constructed central hospital building, were rendered unusable by damage from the storm. Given that the hospital was the only one on the island, and damages were extensive enough that all patients had to be relocated, a survey conducted by engineers from the National Emergency Management Agency of Trinidad and Tobago concluded that the hospital should undergo substantial redesign in order to ensure its structural strength could withstand future storms.

Volcanic eruptions and abandonment

Beginning in July 1995, a series of huge eruptions at the Soufrière Hills volcano, which had been inactive for centuries, sent pyroclastic flows and ash falls across a wide area of southern Montserrat including the capital, Plymouth. It was immediately clear that the town was in grave danger. On 21 August 1995, tephra fell on Plymouth, and in December residents were evacuated as a precaution.

Residents were allowed back a few months later, but on 25 June 1997 a further massive eruption produced pyroclastic surges that killed 19 people and reached nearly to the island's airport on the eastern side of the island. Plymouth was again evacuated.

Between 4–8 August 1997, a further series of large eruptions destroyed approximately 80% of the town, burying it under  of ash. This hot material burned many of the buildings, making habitation nearly impossible for many of the residents.

The pyroclastic flows, lava, ash and other volcanic rock types were mostly compact, having a density similar to that of concrete. The removal of the overburden would have required the use of explosives, bulldozers and other resources too expensive for widespread use. It was anticipated that the soil underneath the hardened mud and lava would have been scorched and left completely non-arable by the intense heat of the pyroclastic flows.

The government ordered the evacuation of Plymouth, with the Royal Navy assisting by taking the population to safety. The entire southern half of the island was declared an exclusion zone because of the continuing volcanic activity at the Soufrière Hills. Government of the island was moved north to the town of Brades, although Plymouth remains the de jure capital. , a new port and capital are under construction at Little Bay, on the island's northwest coast. Daytime access to Plymouth has been permitted for some activities since about 2015, including sand and gravel extraction for construction projects.

The total destruction of Plymouth caused severe economic problems for the island of Montserrat. Plymouth had been by far the largest settlement on the island, with a population of around 4,000 inhabitants, and as such had been the site of almost all the island's shops and services, in addition to having been its seat of government. Some of the lost facilities were subsequently rebuilt elsewhere on Montserrat, but this did not prevent emigration. Between 1995 and 2000, two-thirds of the island's total population was forced to flee, many of whom settled in the United Kingdom, leaving fewer than 1,200 people resident on the island as of 1997. The population figure had risen to nearly 5,000 by 2016.

Geography

Plymouth is situated on the lower southwest slope of the Soufrière Hills Volcano. It is well within the volcanic exclusion zone, which is considered wholly uninhabitable.

Climate

Transport
The airport serving Plymouth, W. H. Bramble Airport, was shut down completely by 1997 and subsequently destroyed as it was buried in volcanic ash. A new airport, John A. Osborne Airport, opened near Brades.

Education

In the pre-1997 period it was served by Plymouth Primary School, and Plymouth Junior Secondary School.

Notable people
 Margaret Dyer-Howe, politician

Gallery

See also
 List of settlements abandoned after the 1997 Soufrière Hills eruption

References

External links

 Video of Plymouth from a MVO helicopter on 24 August 2012 on YouTube

Populated places disestablished in 1997
History of Montserrat
Former populated places in Montserrat
Ghost towns in North America
Destroyed cities
Capitals in the Caribbean
1997 disestablishments in Montserrat
Natural disaster ghost towns
Natural disasters in Montserrat